St Katharine Docks is a former dock and now a mixed-used district in Central London, in the London Borough of Tower Hamlets and within the East End. It lies on the north bank of the River Thames, immediately downstream of the Tower of London and Tower Bridge. From 1828 to 1968, it was one of the commercial docks that made up the Port of London. It is in the redevelopment zone known as Docklands and is now a popular housing and leisure complex.

History
St Katharine Docks took their name from the former hospital of St Katharine's by the Tower, built in the 12th century, which stood on the site. An intensely built-up area, the entire 23-acre (9.5 hectares) Precinct of St Katharine by the Tower and part of East Smithfield, was earmarked for redevelopment by an Act of Parliament in 1825, with construction commencing in May 1827. Some 1250 houses were demolished, together with the medieval hospital of St. Katharine. Around 11,300 inhabitants, mostly port workers crammed into unsanitary slums, lost their homes; only the property owners received compensation. The scheme was designed by engineer Thomas Telford and was his only major project in London. George Turnbull and James Waylen were working for Telford. To create as much quayside as possible, the docks were designed in the form of two linked basins (East and West), both accessed via an entrance lock from the Thames. Steam engines designed by James Watt and Matthew Boulton kept the water level in the basins about four feet above that of the tidal river. By 1830, the docks had cost over £2 million to build.

Telford aimed to minimise the amount of quayside activity and specified that the docks' warehouses (designed by the architect Philip Hardwick) be built right on the quayside so that goods could be unloaded directly into them.

The docks were officially opened on 25 October 1828. Although well used, they were not a great commercial success and were unable to accommodate large ships. They were amalgamated in 1864 with the neighbouring London Docks. In 1909, the Port of London Authority took over the management of almost all of the Thames docks, including St Katharine Dock. By the 1930s the ony regular use was by ships of the General Steam Navigation Company.

St Katharine Docks were badly damaged by German bombing during the Second World War. All the warehouses around the eastern basin were destroyed, and the site they had occupied remained derelict until the 1960s. The dock entrance lock was rebuilt in 1957 but the docks ceased commercial use in 1968. The remaining wharehouses on the western side were demolished to make way for revelopment.

Closure and redevelopment
Because of their very restricted capacity and inability to cope with large modern ships, the St Katharine Docks were among the first to be closed in 1968, and were sold to the Greater London Council. The site was leased to the developers Taylor Woodrow and most of the original warehouses around the western basin were demolished and replaced by modern commercial buildings in the early 1970s, beginning with the bulky Tower Hotel (designed by Renton Howard Wood Partnership; opened in September 1973) on a site parallel to the river just to the east of Tower Bridge. This was followed by the World Trade Centre Building and Commodity Quay (both designed by architects Watkins Gray International). Development around the eastern basin was completed in the 1990s; the docks themselves becoming a marina. The development has often been cited as a model example of successful urban redevelopment.

In 1980, a plan was approved to open a St Katharine Docks Underground station on the proposed extension of the Jubilee line. It would have been between Fenchurch Street and Wapping. An eastwards extension was eventually built as part of the Jubilee line, but took a different route south of the Thames. The closest stations to the Docks today are Tower Hill (tube) and Tower Gateway DLR station, both roughly equidistant from the north-west corner of the Docks.

Vodafone made the first ever cellular telephone call in the United Kingdom on 1 January 1985, from St Katharine Docks to Newbury, and launched the UK's first cellular network later that year.

Between 2005 and 2008, the former Danish lightship "Lightship X" (Ten) was moored on the west dock, and used as a restaurant, before returning to Denmark.

The marina, including restaurants and offices, was owned by Max Property Group, operated by investor Nick Leslau, since 2011, and was sold to Blackstone Group in 2014. Over the next three years, Blackstone completed a major restoration. In May 2017, the company retained agents to find potential buyers for the complex; the listing price was £435m. In October 2017, however, Blackstone withdrew the property from the market because bids were below the asking price.

The docks today

The area now features offices, public and private housing, a large hotel, shops and restaurants, a pub (The Dickens Inn, a former brewery dating back to the 18th century), a yachting marina and other recreational facilities. It remains a popular leisure destination.

The east dock is now dominated by the City Quay residential development, comprising more than 200 privately owned flats overlooking the marina.  The south side of the east dock is surrounded by the South Quay Estate which was originally social housing. The dock is still used by small to medium-sized boats on a daily basis.

The anchor from the wreck of the Dutch East Indiaman Amsterdam is on display at the entrance to the east dock.

Notable boats
Notable boats regularly moored in the docks include:

Gloriana, royal barge
MV Havengore, former Port of London Authority hydrographic survey vessel

Several Thames sailing barges are also based in the docks.

Notable residents
David Mellor, broadcaster and former politician, and Penelope, Viscountess Cobham
David Suchet, actor

In media 

The area was used as one of the main filming locations for the Hammer Film Productions version of Dennis Wheatley's novel To The Devil - A Daughter in 1976, with the character played by Richard Widmark living in one of the residential flats. Scenes featured the Ivory House and the retractable bridge.

In April 2021, it was filmed for Men, a folk horror film directed by Alex Garland and starring Jessie Buckley, released in 2022. It was used for Buckley's character's apartment with her abusive husband, and also where he died.

The inner gatefold photograph for The Rolling Stones album Through the Past Darkly (Big Hits Vol. 2) was taken at St Katherine Docks by Ethan Russell in May 1969.

Tower Bridge Quay

Tower Bridge Quay is close to the St Katharine Dock, providing river transport services managed by London River Services. The main service from Tower Bridge Quay is a circular river cruise operated by Crown River Cruises which goes non-stop to Westminster Millennium Pier before returning via the South Bank arts centre, as well as a Westminster-Greenwich express service run by Thames River Services.

The nearby Tower Millennium Pier, located on the other side of Tower Bridge, now provides the main commuter river boat services to Canary Wharf and Greenwich in the east and the West End in the west, and a fast visitor service to the London Eye.

References

External links

St Katharine Docks Association

London docks
Geography of the London Borough of Tower Hamlets
History of the London Borough of Tower Hamlets
Tourist attractions in London
Transport infrastructure completed in 1828
Works of Thomas Telford
Redeveloped ports and waterfronts in London
Marinas in England
Port of London